Apollonia (also called Stavri) is a village in Sifnos, Cyclades, Greece. It is the capital (chora) and largest village of the island with 869 inhabitants as of the 2011 Greek Census. It is the head of the homonymous municipality, which includes the villages Vathy, Kamares, Kastro, Platys Gialos, Kato Petali, Faros and Chrysopigi and has a total population of 1691 residents. It is named after the god Apollo of the Greek mythology.

General information 
Apollonia is located on top of three hills in the inner part of Sifnos. Traditional cycladic architecture is dominant in the village. People born in Apollonia include satyric poet and journalist Kleanthis Triantafyllopoulos and Gregory VII of Constantinople. In the central square of the village there is a folklore museum. The village also has plenty of churches, something common in the whole island.

References 

Populated places in Milos (regional unit)
Villages in Greece